= TV Mainfranken =

- Lower Franconia; Germany

History
- First air date: February 1988
- Former names: TV Touring (1988–2017)

Links
- Website: https://www.tvmainfranken.de/

TV Mainfranken or TVM for short, styled as tvm (previously TV Touring, styled as TV touring) is a private Bavarian television station for the region Lower Franconia, with an audience of up to 233,000 in 2025.

== History ==
Former logo

TV Touring, founded in 1987, was one of the first private, regional TV stations in Bavaria. It broadcast for the first time in February 1988, in Würzburg. In 1990 the station expanded to broadcast its own programming in Schweinfurt as well. It has run the regional news portal www.tvmainfranken.de since 2006, and also includes its own advertising agency, Mainfranken Media. Since December 2017, the station is called TV Mainfranken.

== Programming ==
Mainfranken aktuell, a 30-minute news magazine, presents current issues in the region. Special interest programmes additionally cover the topics of sport, people, health, talk, news and business, often with a regional connection.

== Reception ==
TV Mainfranken can be accessed through the following transmission methods:

- Cable: the station is broadcast via the cable networks for 24 hours a day, and from 18:00 to 18:30 on the frequency of RTL.
- Satellite, via Franken plus HD
- Internet Protocol television, as part of Telekom Entertain on channel 439
- OTT, via waipu.tv, HD+ ToGo und Zattoo
- Live streaming at www.tvmainfranken.de
- Mobile and smart TV apps

== Awards ==
Between 2009 and 2025, eight productions of TV Mainfranken or Mainfranken Media were awarded prizes by the Bavarian State Office for New Media.
